Estrella Jail is a women-only prison facility located in Phoenix, Arizona.

The prison has a capacity of approximately 1,400. It was constructed in 1991.

Estrella Jail received media attention in 2013 during the trial of Jodi Arias. The media were invited to view her cell by sheriff Joe Arpaio following reports the accused murderer was having an easy time while incarcerated.

Notable inmates
Notable prisoners house at the jail include:
 Jodi Arias – convicted of the murder of Travis Alexander

See also 
 List of Arizona state prisons

References

External links 
  Maricopa County Sheriff's Office – Jails

Jails in Arizona
Women's prisons in Arizona
Buildings and structures in Phoenix, Arizona